The Sind River snake (Enhydris chanardi), also known commonly as Chanard's mud snake and Chan-ard's water snake, is a species of mildly venomous, rear-fanged snake in the family Homalopsidae. The species is endemic to Thailand.

Geographic range
E. chanardi is found near or around Bangkok, Thailand.

Etymology
The specific name, chanardi, is in honour of Thai herpetologist (Mr.) Tanya Chan-ard.

Habitat
The preferred natural habitat of E. chanardi is freshwater wetlands.

Behaviour
E. chanardi is crepuscular or nocturnal.

Diet
E. chanardi preys upon fishes and frogs..

Reproduction
E. chanardi is viviparous.

Conservation status
E. chanardi is listed as "Data Deficient" by the International Union for Conservation of Nature (IUCN). Little is known about the biology of this species.

References

Further reading
Chan-ard T, Parr JWK, Nabhitabhata J (2015). A Field Guide to the Reptiles of Thailand. New York: Oxford University Press. 352 pp.  (hardcover),  (paperback).
Cochran DM (1930). "The herpetological results made by Dr. Hugh Smith in Siam from 1923 to 1929". Proceedings of the United States National Museum 77 (11): 1-39. [1931].
Cox MJ, van Dijk PP, Nabhitabhata J, Thirakhupt K (1998). A Photographic Guide to Snakes and other Reptiles of Peninsular Malaysia, Singapore and Thailand. Sanibel Island Florida: Ralph Curtis Publishing. 144 pp. .
Günther A (1864). The Reptiles of British India. London: The Ray Society. (Taylor & Francis, printers). xxvii + 452 pp. + Plates I-XXVI.
Murphy JC, Voris HK (2005). "A new Thai Enhydris (Serpentes: Colubridae: Homalopsinae)". Raffles Bulletin of Zooogy 53 (1): 143–147. ("Enhydris chanardi, new species").

External links
EOL.org

Enhydris
Reptiles described in 2005